Amor en silencio (English title: Silent Love) is a Mexican telenovela produced by Carla Estrada for Televisa in 1988. Its first broadcast was in Mexico in 1988 and then made its debut in Latin America, Europe, Asia and, in a unique situation, it was broadcast in the United States by Telemundo during primetime. It can be said that this is the only Televisa telenovela that was never shown on Univision. Back then Telemundo got the rights to Amor en silencio and Pasión y poder, the latter one got picked up by Univision in 1993 as daytime programming.

The 1st part of the telenovela was starred by Erika Buenfil and Arturo Peniche while Margarita Sanz, Elvira Monsell and Joaquín Cordero starred as antagonists.

The 2nd part of the telenovela was starred by Erika Buenfil and Omar Fierro while Margarita Sanz, Elvira Monsell, Alberto Mayagoitía, Alberto Estrella, Rosa Furman and Ada Carrasco starred as antagonists.

Plot
Marisela is a rich, beautiful, and intelligent woman who feels a big emptiness in her life that she considers dry and sad. It is then that she meets Fernando, a good and honest man from a great family. When the two fall in love, the two of them face the terrible opposition of their families. On one hand, it's Marisela's father Miguel, who doesn't want Fernando to be part of his family and wants something better for his daughter.

On the other part, it's Fernando's sister Mercedes, who is obsessed with him and doesn't want to see him with anyone other than Paola, Marisela's sister, who becomes infatuated with Fernando and is not willing to let him be with her sister. Marisela, tired of everything and everyone, decides not to listen to anything or anyone and decides to be with the love of her life and has a daughter she names Ana. Terrified of what may come, Marisela asks Fernando to get married as soon as possible and on the day of the wedding, Mercedes goes crazy upon learning about it and takes a gun and murders Marisela and Fernando at the Ocampo family mansion, when they prepare to celebrate their wedding party.

In the middle of the shooting, Marisela's mother Andrea also dies from cardiac arrest. Several years later, Ana (the daughter of the deceased couple), who grew up locked up in a boarding school in the United States, returns to Mexico accompanied by Sandy, her companion in the boarding school and has become her great friend. Ana returns to her grandpa and aunt's house and has grown up into a woman looking physically identical to her mother. This similarity causes Miguel to feel remorse for not having listened to his daughter when she was alive and wants to fix his mistakes by welcoming Ana and giving all of his grandfatherly affection to her.

On the other hand, Paola looks down on her niece with contempt for having the failed love that took her sister. Angel, the adoptive son of Miguel and Andrea, is a deaf-mute man who has been in love with Ana since childhood, but suffers an ordeal in which he can't express his love towards Ana. However, he decides to fight for her love but it is too late. Ana gets engaged to Diego, who only wants to use her to get revenge on his father. Diego's father turns out to be Miguel, because while Miguel was married to Andrea he had an extramarital relationship with Elena in the United States.

This resulted in them having two sons: Diego and Tomas. Diego grew up feeling resentment towards his father, for his brother and mother were "the others" and Miguel never dared to acknowledge them. Diego's resentment was fueled mainly by his ambitious maternal grandmother Ada, who took care of tarnishing Miguel and his legitimate family and used his daughter to blackmail him and to extort money despite opposition from Elena, who was aware of what her place was in Miguel's life and was never interested in demanding something.

Therefore, their children Tomas and Diego turn out to be Marisela's brothers and Ana's uncles. However, in addition to all these obstacles, the real important one to face Ana and Angel's love is Ana's crazed aunt Mercedes, who has escaped from the mental hospital where she had been locked up all these years and only seeks revenge. Upon seeing Ana, Mercedes thinks she's her late mother Marisela and believes she was saved from the attack years ago, so she decides to "put an end" to her once and for all.

Cast 

Erika Buenfil as Marisela Ocampo Trejo/Ana Silva Ocampo
Arturo Peniche as Fernando Silva
Omar Fierro as Angel Trejo
Joaquín Cordero as Miguel Ocampo
Margarita Sanz as Mercedes Silva
Saby Kamalich as Andrea Trejo de Ocampo
Patricia Pereyra as Sandy Grant
Elvira Monsell as Paola Ocampo Trejo
José Elías Moreno as José María Durán  
Alberto Estrella as Pedro
Carlos Espejel as Aníbal
Oscar Morelli as Julián Durán
Isabel Martinez "La Tarabilla" as Martina
Olivia Bucio as Elena Robles
Laura León as Alejandra
Lucha Moreno as Consuelo de Durán
Fernando Balzaretti as Jorge Trejo
Alejandra Maldonado as Mayra Zambrano
Edgardo Gazcon as Tomás Ocampo Robles
Alberto Mayagoitia as Diego Ocampo Robles
Rafael Rojas as Sebastián
Cynthia Klitbo as Aurora
Claudia Guzman as Gaby
Miguel Macía as Roberto
Marina Marín as Olivia
Aurora Alonso as Gudelia
Patricia Martinez as Olga
Fabiola Elenka Tapia as Ana (young)
Juan Bernardo Gazca as Ángel (teenager)  
Rodrigo Ramón as Ángel (young)
Luis Rábago as Carlos
Marta Aura as Celia     
Bárbara Córcega as Mindys 
Ada Carrasco as Ada vda. de Robles
Mauricio Ferrari as Anthony Grant 
Jaime Lozano as Chucho
Rosa Furman as Rosario
Blanca Sánchez as Producer
Alaska as Herself
Enrique Gilabert as Nicolás
Rafaello as Marcelo
Raquel Morell as Lizbeth
María Montaño as Luciana
Morenita as Linda
Marcela Davilland as Elvira de Zambrano
Mauricio Armando as Tomás (young)
Ricardo de Loera as Agent of Police 
Ana María Aguirre as Mercedes's Psychiatrist

Awards

References

External links

1988 telenovelas
Mexican telenovelas
Televisa telenovelas
1988 Mexican television series debuts
1988 Mexican television series endings
Spanish-language telenovelas
Television shows set in Mexico